Kamone is a village in the Karmala taluka of Solapur district in Maharashtra state, India.

Demographics
Covering  and comprising 309 households at the time of the 2011 census of India, Kamone had a population of 1424. There were 738 males and 686 females, with 172 people being aged six or younger.

References

Villages in Karmala taluka